The 1963–64 SK Rapid Wien season was the 66th season in club history.

Squad

Squad and statistics

Squad statistics

Fixtures and results

League

Cup

Fairs Cup

References

1963-64 Rapid Wien Season
Rapid
Austrian football championship-winning seasons